John Craig (1843 – September 6, 1898) was an Irish-born Ontario newspaper publisher and political figure. He represented Wellington East in the Legislative Assembly of Ontario from 1894 to 1898 as a Liberal member.

He was born in County Antrim, Ireland and educated there. Craig was editor and owner of the Fergus News-Record, which he purchased with his brother Robert in 1869. He served on the Fergus Board of Education, serving two years as chairman.

Craig died in office shortly after his reelection in 1898. His son James took over the operation of the newspaper but died four years later. James' wife Alice sold the paper after running it herself for a few months.

External links 
The Canadian parliamentary companion, 1897 JA Gemmill

Fergus; the Story of a Little Town, H Templin

1843 births
1898 deaths
19th-century Canadian journalists
19th-century Canadian male writers
Canadian male journalists
Journalists from Ontario
Irish emigrants to Canada (before 1923)
Ontario Liberal Party MPPs
People from Centre Wellington